5080 Oja, provisional designation , is a stony Florian asteroid from the inner regions of the asteroid belt, approximately 8 kilometers in diameter. It was discovered on 2 March 1976, by astronomer Claes-Ingvar Lagerkvist at the Kvistaberg Station of the Uppsala Observatory in Sweden. In 1992, it was named after Estonian–Swedish astronomer Tarmo Oja. The S-type asteroid has a rotation period of 7.222 hours.

Orbit and classification 

Oja is a member of the Flora family,  a giant asteroid family and the largest family of stony asteroids in the main-belt. It orbits the Sun in the inner main-belt at a distance of 2.0–2.5 AU once every 3 years and 4 months (1,226 days; semi-major axis of 2.24 AU). Its orbit has an eccentricity of 0.12 and an inclination of 5° with respect to the ecliptic.

Physical characteristics 

Oja has been characterized as a common, stony S-type asteroid by Pan-STARRS photometric survey, in line with the overall spectral type of the Flora family.

Rotation period 

In January 2006, a rotational lightcurve of Oja was obtained from photometric observations by an international collaboration of astronomers including Petr Pravec at Ondřejov Observatory and Donald Pray at Carbuncle Hill Observatory . The consolidated lightcurve analysis gave a rotation period of 7.222 hours and a brightness variation between 0.31 and 0.39 magnitude. The result supersedes a period of 7.7 hours obtained by the discoverer (Claes-Ingvar Lagerkvist) in March 1976.

Diameter and albedo 

According to the survey carried out by the NEOWISE mission of NASA's Wide-field Infrared Survey Explorer, Oja measures between 6.94 and 8.399 kilometers in diameter  and its surface has an albedo between 0.1573 and 0.31. The Collaborative Asteroid Lightcurve Link adopts an albedo of 0.1573 from Pravec's revised WISE data and uses a diameter of 8.38 kilometers based on an absolute magnitude of 13.01.

Naming 

This minor planet was named after the Swedish astronomer of Estonian descent Tarmo Oja (born 1934), who was a professor in astronomy at Uppsala University and the director of the discovering Kvistaberg Station during 1970–1999. His research included the structure of galaxies and variable stars. The official naming citation was published by the Minor Planet Center on 14 July 1992.

Notes

References

External links 
 Asteroid Lightcurve Database (LCDB), query form (info )
 Dictionary of Minor Planet Names, Google books
 Asteroids and comets rotation curves, CdR – Observatoire de Genève, Raoul Behrend
 Discovery Circumstances: Numbered Minor Planets (5001)-(10000) – Minor Planet Center
 
 

005080
005080
Discoveries by Claes-Ingvar Lagerkvist
Named minor planets
19760302